Crooked Creek is a  tributary of the Tioga River located entirely in Tioga County, Pennsylvania in the United States.

Geography 

The difference in elevation ( divided by the length of the creek of gives the average drop in elevation per unit length of creek or relief ratio of 39.1 ft/mi (7.4 m/km ). The meander ratio is 1.07, so despite its name, the creek is fairly straight in its bed.

Watershed 
The watershed accounts for 12.2% of Tioga County by area.

Hammond Reservoir 
Crooked Creek has one major impoundment, the Hammond Reservoir, formed by a dam just before it enters the Tioga River. Built together with the adjoining Tioga Dam and Tioga Lake (on the Tioga River), the total project cost $200 million.

The dam projects were initially authorized by the United States Congress in the Flood Control Act of July 3, 1958 (Public Law 85-500). A channel connects the two lakes so that Hammond Lake (which has greater storage capacity) may be used to store excess (flood) water from Tioga Lake.

However, in addition to flood control on the Chemung and North Branch Susquehanna Rivers, the dams are also meant to help decrease the acidity of water in the Tioga River downstream of the dams by dilution with the more neutral waters of Crooked Creek. The Tioga River's acidity is caused by acid mine drainage.

The lakes also offer recreational opportunities, including camping, boating, fishing, swimming, and hiking on area trails.

See also 
 List of rivers of Pennsylvania

References

External links 
 U.S. Geological Survey: PA stream gaging stations
 Pennsylvania Department of Transportation Map of Tioga County showing Crooked Creek
 U.S. Army Corps of Engineers page on Tioga-Hammond Lakes
 History of the Hammond-Tioga Dam Project

Rivers of Pennsylvania
Rivers of Tioga County, Pennsylvania
Tributaries of the Chemung River